Take the Message Everywhere (1968) is the debut album release for Jesus music/gospel music performers Andraé Crouch and the Disciples.

Track listing
All tracks composed by Andraé Crouch; except where noted.

Side one

 "He Never Sleeps" (Traditional; arranged by Andraé Crouch) - 2:25
 "Everywhere" - 2:00
 "The Broken Vessel" - 2:32
 "I've Got It" - 2:20
 "Without a Song" (Billy Rose, Edward Eliscu, Vincent Youmans) - 2:45

Side two

 "No, Not One" - 2:20
 "I'll Never Forget" - 2:29
 "The Blood Will Never Lose Its Power" - 2:58
 "Wade in the Water" - 2:05
 "What Makes a Man Turn His Back on God?" - 2:23
 "Precious Lord, Take My Hand" (Thomas A. Dorsey) - 2:07

References

1968 debut albums
Andraé Crouch albums
Light Records albums